Caroline Simard is a Canadian politician in Quebec, who was elected to the National Assembly of Quebec in the 2014 Quebec election, defeating Premier Pauline Marois in her own riding.  She represents the riding of Charlevoix–Côte-de-Beaupré as a member of the Quebec Liberal Party.

Political career
Simard's candidacy in the 2014 Quebec election was her first time running for public office.   Although she was sometimes accused during the campaign of being the Quebec Liberal Party's paper candidate in Charlevoix–Côte-de-Beaupré,  she defeated Marois by 882 votes.  Upon taking office, Simard was disappointed to discover that the staff of the former Premier had emptied Marois' constituency offices in the riding of all files, forcing Simard's staff to start from zero recreating files on local issues.

Personal life
Simard is originally from Baie-Saint-Paul.  She obtained her DCS from the Collège François-Xavier-Garneau in Quebec City, and graduated with a B.A. in French language studies (writing and communication) at the Université de Sherbrooke.

Prior to her election to the legislature, Simard worked in marketing research.  She started her professional career at Statistics Canada in 1996.  After periods working at Tenor Marketing in Sherbrooke, Léger Marketing in Montreal and the Impact-Recherche division of Groupe Cossette Communication in Quebec City, she started her own firm, Doxa Focus, in December 2006.

References

External links
 

French Quebecers
Living people
People from Baie-Saint-Paul
Quebec Liberal Party MNAs
Université de Sherbrooke alumni
Women MNAs in Quebec
21st-century Canadian politicians
21st-century Canadian women politicians
Year of birth missing (living people)